Thomas Alan Wayne, M.D. is a fictional character appearing in American comic books published by DC Comics. He is the father of Bruce Wayne (Batman), and husband of Martha Wayne as well as the paternal grandfather of Damian Wayne. Wayne was introduced in Detective Comics #33 (November 1939), the first exposition of Batman's origin story. A gifted surgeon and philanthropist to Gotham City, Wayne inherited the Wayne family fortune after Patrick Wayne. When Wayne and his wife are murdered in a street mugging, Bruce is inspired to fight crime in Gotham as the vigilante Batman.

Wayne was revived in Geoff Johns' alternate timeline comic Flashpoint (2011), in which he plays a major role as a hardened version of Batman, whose son was killed instead of his wife and himself, and dies again by the end of the storyline. Wayne returned to the main DC Universe in DC Rebirth, as a revived amalgamation of his original self killed by Joe Chill and his Flashpoint Batman self killed in "The Button".

As a key figure in the origin of Batman, Thomas Wayne has appeared in multiple forms of media. Notable portrayals of the character in live-action include Linus Roache in Batman Begins, Jeffrey Dean Morgan in Batman v Superman: Dawn of Justice, Brett Cullen in Joker, and Luke Roberts in The Batman. Ben Aldridge also portrays him in the television series Pennyworth.

Background
Thomas Wayne, M.D. is seldom shown outside of Bruce Wayne's and Alfred Pennyworth's memories of him, and Bruce's dreams and nightmares. He is frequently depicted as looking very much like his son, but with a mustache.

A notable occurrence in Thomas’ biography was when Bruce falls through a fissure on the Wayne property, into what would one day become the Batcave (sometimes the fissure is replaced with an abandoned well). Thomas eventually rescues his terrified son from the cave.

Dr. Wayne's role in his son's future vigilante career is expanded upon in "The First Batman", a Silver Age tale from Detective Comics #235, which reveals that Dr. Wayne attacks and defeats hoodlums while dressed like a "Bat-Man" for a masquerade ball. According to the story, Dr. Wayne's actions result in crime boss Lew Moxon being imprisoned; ten years later, Moxon orders Joe Chill to murder Dr. Wayne. Realizing Moxon ordered his parents killed, Batman confronts Moxon, now suffering from amnesia and thus has no memory of Dr. Wayne. When his costume is torn, Batman wears his father's in order to frighten Moxon. Sure enough, the costume restores Moxon's memory; the former crime boss panics, believing that Thomas’ ghost is attacking, and flees into the streets and is struck and killed by a truck. These events were retold in the 1980 miniseries The Untold Legend of the Batman. Following the Crisis on Infinite Earths, Thomas as the "First Batman" was retconned - he instead attends the masquerade ball as Zorro. This was retconned once more in the pages of Superman/Batman, where Superman, hoping to reverse some universe-altering change in the time streams, lands in a version of Gotham City in which Thomas never died, finding him giving out Halloween candy in the original Batman costume.

In many of the modern interpretations of the character, such as those by Frank Miller and Jeph Loeb, Thomas Wayne is portrayed as having been a somewhat  distant, stern father, bestowing more kindness and generosity on his patients than his own son.

Dr. Wayne was once suspected to be the father of Bane. However, DNA testing proved this to be false, and Bane's real father was recently revealed to be King Snake.

In Batman: The Long Halloween, a flashback reveals that Thomas Wayne saved the life of gangster Carmine Falcone. Falcone's father Vincent Falcone came to Wayne Manor and begged Thomas to save his dying son, who had been shot by rival gangster Luigi Maroni. Thomas wanted to take the younger Falcone to the hospital, but Vincent insisted that nobody know about the shooting; the surgery was thus performed in the dining room with Alfred assisting. After saving Carmine's life, he was offered a reward or favor, but refused to accept any form of payment. Unbeknownst to Thomas, young Bruce watched this all in silence from afar. Years later, Bruce contemplates whether Gotham would have been better off had his father let Falcone die; Alfred replies that Thomas would have helped anyone in need.

In Superman/Batman #50, it is revealed that, while on a drive with a pregnant Martha Wayne, Thomas witnesses a strange object fall to Earth. As he inspects it, Thomas' consciousness is transported to Krypton, and presented in a holographic form. There, he encounters Jor-El, wishing to know what kind of a world Earth is, as it is one of many possible candidates for him to send his son Kal-El to. Thomas tells Jor-El that the people of Earth aren't perfect, but are essentially a good and kind race, who would raise the child right, convincing Jor-El to send Kal-El there. Upon returning to his body, Thomas uses the technology in the Kryptonian probe to revitalize a failing Wayne Enterprises. Years later, the alien technology would be the basis of much of Batman's crimefighting technology. Thomas recorded his encounter in a diary, which was discovered by Bruce in the present day.

Murder

When exiting a movie theater (opera in some versions), Thomas and Martha Wayne are murdered by a mugger in front of their son, Bruce Wayne. This tragedy shocks Gotham and leads to Park Row (the street where it occurred) being labeled Crime Alley. Most importantly, it serves as the motivation for Bruce to become Batman.

Alleged double life
During Batman R.I.P., it is alleged that Thomas Wayne and Martha Wayne were leading a double life, secretly partaking in criminal endeavors, drug abuse and orgies while presenting a façade of respectability to the outside world. The alleged evidence is revealed to be doctored in the aftermath of the storyline, however.

Doctor Simon Hurt, head of the Black Glove and the mastermind behind Batman R.I.P., actually claims to be Thomas Wayne to both Bruce Wayne and Alfred Pennyworth. Although both of them rebuke him without hesitation, Hurt never explicitly drops the claim.

In the ongoing follow-up series, Batman & Robin, it is suggested that some, if not all, of these allegations have begun to circulate around Gotham; Dick Grayson and Damian Wayne attend a high society function where a few party guests vaguely mention the existence of rumors surrounding the family, and Dick tries to tie Bruce's absence from the public eye with being occupied with clearing his family's reputation. Matters come to a head when Hurt returns to the city, claiming to be Thomas Wayne in order to take control of Wayne Manor and establish himself as the new Batman, but Grayson and Damian outsmart him.

It is hinted at during the course of the Batman and Robin series that Simon Hurt's actual identity is Thomas Wayne, albeit one from the 17th century who was a 'black sheep' of the Wayne family and prolongs his life through occult rituals. The Return of Bruce Wayne miniseries and its fallout Bruce Wayne: The Road Home cements Hurt's status as the elder Thomas Wayne from the Puritan Ages, driven insane by his meeting with Barbatos, the Hyper-Adapter sent through time along with Bruce Wayne to ensure the effectiveness of Darkseid's "Omega Sanction".

Flashpoint and resurrection as Batman

Other versions

Batman: Castle of the Bat
In Batman: Castle of the Bat, Doctor Bruce Wayne discovers the preserved brain of his father deep below the research university where he works. He steals this and other body parts in a desperate attempt to revive his beloved father from death. This doesn't work out well due to various factors outside his control, but the part of the creature that still recognizes and loves his son does its best to help Bruce escape his enemies and expose the person responsible for the Waynes' murders; Thomas had discovered that one of his colleagues was killing people to perfect the preservation fluid used to store organs (Including Thomas's own brain, claimed by his killer after his death).

Batman: Dark Knight Dynasty
In Batman: Dark Knight Dynasty, Thomas Wayne and Martha Wayne are saved from death when Valentin Sinclair- really Vandal Savage, a man who has a long-standing interest and admiration for the Wayne family despite the fact that they often end up opposing him when they learn about his plans- scares off Joe Chill. Sinclair then becomes a partner in Wayne Enterprises, only to have the Waynes killed when they threaten to expose his plan to divert the meteor that gave him his powers back to Earth in order to study it. Their deaths come at the hands of Sinclair's fear-inducing henchman Scarecrone who causes them to remember the mugging, which drives them to flee Chill by running off their balcony. This prompts Bruce to become Batman to investigate.

Batman: Holy Terror
In Batman: Holy Terror, depicting an alternate timeline where Oliver Cromwell established a theocratic government across the globe, Thomas Wayne is the chief physician of the Privy Council, but when it is discovered that he is treating various 'enemies of the state' such as Jews or homosexuals, the Star Chamber votes by secret ballot to have him and Martha executed and make it look like a random mugging.

Batman: Earth One

In the graphic novel written by Geoff Johns and with art by Gary Frank, Batman: Earth One, Thomas Wayne was a physician who had run for mayor against Oswald Cobblepot. Cobblepot had attempted to arrange his opponent's murder during the latter's outing to a movie with his family, but a mugger got to them first and killed Thomas and his wife. It is also implied that both he and Alfred are keeping a traumatic secret from their families.

JLA: Earth 2
In JLA: Earth 2 by Grant Morrison and Frank Quitely, the Thomas Wayne of the antimatter universe is the father of the supervillain Owlman. Like his original counterpart, he married Martha Kane and fathered Bruce Wayne. However, this version also had a second child named Thomas Wayne Jr. After Martha and Bruce are gunned down by a crooked police officer when Thomas Sr. refused to accompany him for questioning as Thomas Wayne had performed an "illegal medical operation," Thomas Jr. becomes Owlman to get revenge on the justice system. It is later revealed that Thomas Wayne Sr. is currently acting as commissioner of the Gotham City Police Department, seeking to bring his son to justice with the help of a cadre of idealistic officers. Owlman finds it his goal to "punish" his father for letting his mother and brother die.

Superman: Red Son
In Mark Millar's Superman: Red Son, Batman's (unnamed) parents are anti-communist protesters in the Soviet Union. They are executed in their home by NKVD Commissar Pyotr Roslov for printing and distributing anti-communist pamphlets. Their son witnesses the murders and attempts to overthrow the Communist Party of the Soviet Union when he is an adult.

Smallville
The fifth issue of the comic book continuation of the television series Smallville, written by executive story editor Bryan Q. Miller, reveals that Lionel Luthor invited Thomas to join the secret society Veritas with Virgil Swann, which Thomas declined.

The New 52

Earth 2
In the revised Earth-Two alternate universe of "The New 52", Thomas Wayne is revealed to be the second version of Batman, having succeeded his son as the incumbent through use of the Miraclo pill of Hourman which enhances his strength and agility. He states that he is 65 years old. In contrast to his depiction on the Prime Earth, he and Martha Wayne are targeted for assassination due to Thomas's Mafia connections and subsequent efforts to "straighten out" when Bruce was born. Thomas hides the fact that he survived for many years in order to keep Bruce safe. Eventually, when the first version of Batman tracks Thomas down, he learns the truth and rejects Thomas's reason for being "dead" for most of Bruce's life, thus discouraging him from ever having any future relationship with his son, and by extension Bruce and Selina Kyle Wayne's family. However, he watched them from afar and tried to be as involved as he could, particularly with their daughter Helena. After Bruce's death saving Earth 2 from an Apokoliptan invasion, Thomas honors him by taking up the "mantle of the Bat" and makes use of Miraclo to help him fight crime.

After Earth-2's destruction in the war with Apokolips as seen in the Convergence storyline, Thomas Wayne is one of the few survivors transferred to Telos's world, along with Dick Grayson and other heroes. While investigating this world, Thomas travels with Dick into a variation of the pre-Flashpoint Gotham City where he has an unknown conversation with Bruce before he departs with Dick in a flying Batmobile. When they are cornered by the Club of Villains, who pursued them out of the city, Thomas sacrifices himself in a suicide bomb blast, destroying most of the Club of Villains in the process, his last words being to inform the Club of Villains that they will never hurt another Batman.

Thomas was succeeded in the Batman mantle by Dick.

Earth 3
In the revised Earth-Three alternate universe of "The New 52", Thomas Wayne Sr. is featured in Owlman's origin story. In stark contrast to Batman's father who was a highly skilled surgeon and philanthropist who had saved countless lives during his time, Earth 3's Thomas Wayne is a cowardly and sociopathic doctor who often kills his patients (Martha claims that this is due to a "surgical fetish") and spends his money on lawyers to cover up his patients' deaths as accidents. Earth 3's Alfred kills him along with Martha and Bruce Wayne as per Thomas Wayne Jr.'s orders. Owlman later states that his father was a weak man and wonders why Batman would devote his life to the memory of Thomas Wayne of Prime Earth.

When Earth 3 was rebooted during the "Infinite Frontier" storyline, Thomas Wayne Sr. and Martha Wayne were depicted as criminals. After they caused the death of Jimmy Gordon Jr., Boss Gordon sent Harvey Bullock to kill them where Bruce was also killed and Thomas Wayne Jr. was left alive. Years later, Thomas Wayne Jr. in the identity of Owlman would learn this fact when he interrogates Bullock.

DC Comics Bombshells
In the opening of the first issue of the comics DC Comics Bombshells, set in an alternate history 1940, Thomas and Martha Wayne's lives are saved by an already-existing Batwoman, implying that Bruce Wayne will never grow up to become Batman. However, in the final issue, set in 1960, the now grown up Bruce Wayne takes up training and becomes Batman, to honor the person who saved him and his parents' lives.

In other media

Television

Live-action
 While Thomas never appears in the 1960s Batman television series, Bruce Wayne has brought up that the murder of his parents is what motivates him to take down criminals. In the first episode, Bruce mentions his father's law books, implying that his father wasn't a doctor like the other versions.
 Thomas Wayne appears on the Fox television series Gotham, portrayed by Grayson McCouch in the pilot. His and Martha Wayne's murder is the main focus of the series as they are shot in the pilot episode by a masked man. This murder was also witnessed by Selina Kyle. In the episode "The Anvil or the Hammer", it is revealed that Thomas had known about illegal activities at Wayne Enterprises, which may have had something to do with his murder. In the episode "Wrath of the Villains: This Ball of Mud and Meanness", it is revealed that Patrick "Matches" Malone killed Thomas and Martha Wayne. In the episode "Wrath of the Villains: Pinewood", Thomas is revealed to have been a close friend of Hugo Strange who attempted to reason with him prior to his death to not oppose the group behind Wayne Enterprises. This led to Strange being given orders to orchestrate Thomas Wayne's death. In the episode "Ace Chemicals", Bruce's archnemesis Jeremiah Valeska abducts a husband and wife who had the same bone structure and build as Thomas and Martha Wayne and, with help from Jervis Tetch's mind control devices, conditioned them to believe they are the Waynes - all part of Jeremiah's plot to torment Bruce by re-enacting the night of his parents' murder. Jeremiah kills the doubles after they have served their purpose, and replaces them with a hypnotized Jim Gordon and Leslie Thompkins. Selina Kyle ultimately saves Gordon and Thompkins, and foils Jeremiah's plan.
 Thomas Wayne appears in the prequel series Pennyworth portrayed by Ben Aldridge. In this version, he is a CIA agent operating out of Gotham City in England to monitor the young Alfred Pennyworth. In the end of season 2, he and Martha Kane get married and have a daughter. Even though in the Batman comic book adaptation that Thomas and Martha have one child that is their son Bruce who becomes the Batman.
 A photo of Thomas appears in Wayne Manor in Titans.
 In Gotham Knights convicted murder Joe Chill was sentenced to death for the murders of Thomas and Martha Wayne.  He claims he is a mere patsy in the scheme.  The Court of Owls wants him executed before the truth can come out.

Animation
 Thomas Wayne appears with his wife in The Super Powers Team: Galactic Guardians, voiced by Paul Kirby. In a flashback in the episode "The Fear", Thomas, Martha, and Bruce are confronted by an unidentified mugger, just after watching a Robin Hood film. When Thomas tries to fight the mugger, Bruce says "No Dad, he's got a..." and lightning flashes as his parents are shot offscreen. This was the first time Batman's origin was shown outside of the comics.
 Dr. Thomas Wayne is alluded on The Batman. Dr. Wayne was a good friend of Marion Grange (who was mayor of Gotham City for the first four seasons), Lucius Fox (CEO of Wayne Enterprises) and Alfred Pennyworth. After taking their son to watch the film The Cloaked Rider, Thomas and Martha Wayne were murdered by an unidentified mugger. In several episodes in the first season, Bruce Wayne goes over his parents' murder several times. In the fourth season's premiere, Batman tells Dick Grayson, whose parents have just been murdered by Tony Zucco, that "the man who murdered my parents was never brought to justice." Also in the future as seen in "Artifacts," it was misinterpreted that Thomas was Batman while Martha was Batwoman and their son was Red Robin.
 Thomas Wayne is featured several times in Batman: The Brave and the Bold, voiced by Corey Burton (in "Invasion of the Secret Santas!" and "Dawn of the Deadman!") and by Adam West (in "Chill of the Night!"). He appears in a flashback of the episode "Invasion of the Secret Santas!" and also appears as a ghost in the episode "Dawn of the Deadman!". The character has a more central role in the episode "Chill of the Night!", where the Phantom Stranger takes Batman back in time to a costume party Thomas attended. Batman notes that Thomas's costume is very similar to his own design. Batman teams up with his father to fight a gang of robbers led by Lew Moxon and learns new information about Thomas's and Martha's murder.
 Thomas Wayne appears in several flashback sequences in Beware the Batman, voiced by Anthony Ruivivar. He appears in the episodes "Secrets", "Fall", "Monsters", and "Unique".

DC Animated Universe
 Thomas Wayne has sporadic appearances in the DC Animated Universe, primarily voiced by Kevin Conroy.
 Thomas Wayne appears in Batman: The Animated Series, initially voiced by Richard Moll (in "Nothing to Fear", "Dreams in Darkness" and "Two-Face"). In this version, Thomas and his wife Martha Wayne are murdered in Crime Alley by an unidentified man. The murder is only occasionally alluded to via nightmares. In the episode "Nothing to Fear", Batman is under the influence of the Scarecrow's fear toxin and has a hallucination of his father being ashamed of him. In the episode "Dreams in Darkness", Batman is once again drugged with fear toxin and sees his parents walking towards a tunnel, and runs towards them telling them to stop. They enter the tunnel, which is revealed to be the barrel of a giant gun, dripping blood. Batman screams as the world is bleached white and a loud shot is heard. In the episode "Two-Face", Batman has a nightmare about failing to save the titular villain, and Thomas appears alongside Martha and asks, "Why couldn't you save us, son?". The series also makes use of the rose motif that the films Batman and Batman Forever associate with the murder. Bruce Wayne leaves roses at the site of his parents' murder on the event's anniversary (as he does in the comics except that he leaves the roses on their graves). As in the comics, his friend Dr. Leslie Thompkins serves as one of his son's legal guardians. Thomas was also close friends with Dr. Matthew Thorne, brother of crime lord Rupert Thorne and Dr. Long (faculty of Gotham University).
 Thomas Wayne appears in Justice League Unlimited. In the episode "For the Man Who Has Everything", Batman is briefly trapped by a hallucinogenic plant called "The Black Mercy" which puts him into an idealized dream world where his father fought and was on the verge of defeating Joe Chill. When the Black Mercy is removed (by Wonder Woman who is also shouting Bruce's name in an effort to wake him from the dream), the hallucination ends with Chill regaining the upper hand and the memory returning to original.

Film

Live-action

Batman (1989 film series)

 Thomas Wayne appeared in Tim Burton's 1989 Batman, portrayed by David Baxt. In a flashback, the Waynes are ambushed in an alley by Jack Napier's gang. As Thomas tries to defend Martha from Napier's partner, Napier shoots him and Martha.
 Batman Forever (1995) features a new flashback to the murder of the Waynes, with Michael Scranton as Thomas Wayne.

The Dark Knight Trilogy

 Linus Roache played Thomas Wayne in Batman Begins (2005). In this incarnation, he is a surgeon at the Gotham City hospital, the fifth generation of the Wayne family to live in Wayne Manor, and was the chairman of Wayne Enterprises. When the young Bruce Wayne falls into a cave, Thomas personally rescues his son by rappelling down into the cave. Thomas says to his son, "Bruce, why do we fall?...So that we can learn to pick ourselves up again." According to Alfred Pennyworth (Michael Caine), Thomas and Martha Wayne believed the example they set would help inspire Gotham's wealthy elite to participate in helping the city. One of his endeavors included building an efficient public transit system in the form of raised trains, in order to provide free transportation to the people of Gotham. In this version, he and Martha (Sara Stewart) are murdered at gunpoint by Joe Chill (Richard Brake). They leave the performance of the opera Mefistofele early when Bruce is scared by performers dressed as bats. Thomas tries to protect his wife after Chill tries to rip off Martha's necklace. Chill then shoots and kills both of them and runs off. Wayne's last words to his son are "Bruce... It's okay. Don't be afraid." It is revealed in the film that the deaths of two such prominent citizens encourages Gotham City's elite to bring it back from the brink of ruin, temporarily foiling Ra's al Ghul's (Liam Neeson) plan to destroy Gotham's economy.
 In The Dark Knight Rises (2012), Bruce Wayne is helped by his father's memory with the strength to climb out and escape of "The Pit" prison in the Middle East that superficially resembles the well that Thomas rescued his son from as a child.

DC Extended Universe

 Jeffrey Dean Morgan portrayed Thomas Wayne in the 2016 film Batman v Superman: Dawn of Justice. In this version, the Waynes leave the theater after seeing the 1940 Tyrone Power version of The Mark of Zorro. A mugger holds them at gunpoint under a train bridge. Thomas steps in front of the mugger in an attempt to save his family, but the mugger shoots him. His wife Martha (Lauren Cohan) is also shot, and the recoil of the pistol destroys her necklace.
 A portrait of Thomas Wayne in the likeness of Jeffrey Dean Morgan appears in Wayne Manor in both the 2016 film Batman v Superman: Dawn of Justice and the 2017 film Justice League.

Joker
Brett Cullen portrays Thomas Wayne in the 2019 film Joker.

In this film, Thomas Wayne is portrayed much less sympathetically than in other incarnations. He is a successful businessman who is running to become Mayor of Gotham City, but he has little sympathy for the lower classes, dismissing the poor as "clowns" who have no one but themselves to blame for their misfortune. During the course of the movie, Arthur Fleck (Joaquin Phoenix) discovers from a letter his mother Penny (Frances Conroy) is writing that he may be Wayne's son, the product of Wayne's affair with Penny while she worked for him as a maid. Arthur sneaks backstage at a campaign event and confronts Wayne, who denies that Arthur is his son or that he and Penny ever had an affair; he says that Penny is delusional and made up the whole thing. Thomas then punches Arthur in the face for earlier speaking to his son Bruce, and threatens to kill him if he ever comes near Bruce again. Considering later revelations that some parts of Arthur's life were all a delusion, it is unclear how much of his meetings with Thomas should be taken literally or if any of these events happened at all.

At the end of the film, Thomas, Martha (Carrie Louise Putrello) and Bruce attempt to flee a riot that Arthur - now calling himself "Joker" - indirectly caused, only for one of the masked rioters to follow them and kill him and Martha in front of Bruce, starting him on the path to becoming Batman.

The Batman
Luke Roberts portrayed Thomas in the 2022 film The Batman. As in the comics, Wayne saved Carmine Falcone's (John Turturro) life. While running for mayor, he was met by a reporter who threatened to reveal his wife Martha's family history of mental illness. Desperate, Wayne turned to Falcone to have the latter intimidate the reporter, only for Falcone to kill him so he could have something on the Wayne family. Wayne, wracked with guilt, threatened to reveal everything to the police; he and his wife to be killed were murdered a week later. It is implied they may have been assassinated on the orders of either Falcone or Salvatore Maroni, but it is left ambiguous.

Animation
 Thomas Wayne is referenced several times in The Batman vs. Dracula.
 Dr. Thomas Wayne appears in Batman: Gotham Knight, voiced by Jason Marsden.
 Thomas Wayne appears in Batman: The Dark Knight Returns, voiced by Bruce Timm.
 The Flashpoint iteration of Batman appears in Justice League: The Flashpoint Paradox, voiced by Kevin McKidd. As in the original Flashpoint universe, Thomas Wayne turns into the crime-fighting vigilante Batman after his son's death, while Martha Wayne goes insane and becomes the Joker. Batman does not care about crime outside Gotham City and has his successful casinos fund his seemingly fruitless war on crime. Despite his cynical outlook, Batman reluctantly assists Barry Allen with a device to recreate the accident behind Barry's powers as the Flash. After the first attempt fails and the second attempt restores Barry's powers, Batman and Flash contact Cyborg for help in tracking down the government branch that hid the frail Kal-El. When Kal-El's freedom fails along with Flash's painful altered memories, the alternate Dark Knight tries to prevent the Flash's mental deterioration with his son's memory. As the World War between Aquaman and Wonder Woman reaches its breaking point, Cyborg's crude team heads to the final battle in Batman's plane. During the chaos, Batman and Grifter kill off Black Manta, and the alternate Dark Knight is injured by the Ocean Master. Batman then shoots the Reverse Flash in the head. Before Flash leaves to escape the alternate world, Thomas gives Flash a letter for his son. In the New 52 universe, Flash gives Thomas' letter to Batman (Bruce Wayne).
 Thomas Wayne briefly appears during a flashback in Son of Batman.
 Thomas Wayne appears in Batman vs. Robin, voiced again by Kevin Conroy.
 In The Lego Batman Movie, a picture of Thomas, Martha and a young Bruce is seen in Wayne Manor as Bruce looks at it telling his dead parents that he saved Gotham City again.
 Thomas Wayne appears in DC Super Heroes vs. Eagle Talon, voiced by Frogman.
 The Flashpoint iteration of Batman makes non-voiced appearances in Suicide Squad: Hell to Pay, recalling the moment he shot Eobard Thawne in the head in The Flashpoint Paradox, a feat acknowledged with respect by Deadshot.
 Thomas Wayne appears in the film, Batman: Death in the Family, voiced by John DiMaggio. 
 Thomas Wayne appears in the film, Batman: The Long Halloween, Part Two, voiced by Robin Atkin Downes.

Video games
 Thomas Wayne makes a cameo in Batman: Rise of Sin Tzu.
 The Flashpoint Batman's outfit is one of the playable costumes for Batman (Bruce Wayne) in Injustice: Gods Among Us.
 Thomas Wayne appears in flashbacks in Batman: The Telltale Series, voiced by Troy Baker. In this continuity, it is revealed that he was corrupt and had criminal ties to Carmine Falcone and Mayor Hamilton Hill with him bankrolling their criminal activities. Additionally, Thomas was responsible for forcibly putting a number of people to Arkham Asylum if they were a threat to him and his allies or opposed any of their actions, including Oswald Cobblepot's mother, Esther after she refused to give her land to Thomas which causes Oswald to harbour a deep-rooted vendetta against the Wayne family, including his childhood friend Bruce. Once Martha discovered the full extent of his crimes, she began planning to expose him, only for Hill to discover her plan and send Joe Chill to kill both Thomas and Martha in Crime Alley. Alfred Pennyworth his butler, planned on leaving his service after being tired of putting up with his criminal life and the pressure to keep his illegal activities secret, but stayed to look after Bruce when they died. Bruce and most of Gotham remained unaware of his crimes until twenty years after his death when a group called the Children of Arkham (a group largely consisting of Thomas' victims and their loved ones) publicly release evidence of his crimes. Due to Thomas being long dead by the time his crimes became public, Bruce (despite having no involvement in his father's crimes) becomes the target of much of the anger from both the Children of Arkham and the people of Gotham, with many of them convincing themselves that Bruce is no better than his father. Bruce as a result had doubts about his vigilante crusade on learning of his father's criminal life. 
 Thomas Wayne is mentioned in Batman: The Enemy Within, a sequel to Batman: The Telltale Series. He is mentioned by Bruce Wayne when reviewing his father's actions and brings him up when he talks with Harley Quinn. He is a major factor in why Alfred decides to leave Bruce in the 5th episode, fearing that Bruce's need for control will end in his death as it did with Thomas.

Batman Arkham
Thomas Wayne is featured in the Batman Arkham series where Kevin Conroy reprises the role:

 In Batman: Arkham Asylum, Batman, while under the influence of the Scarecrow's fear toxin, experiences flashbacks of his parents' murder, and has nightmares of his parents in body bags in the medical facility’s morgue. Additionally, a bench in Arkham Asylum dedicated to Thomas and Martha Wayne is the answer to one of the Riddler's riddles, which leads to Thomas and Martha's unlockable biography.
 Thomas Wayne is alluded in Batman: Arkham City. The Monarch Theatre (the site of the Wayne murders) is featured in Arkham City. Near the gates of Ra's al Ghul's hideout, Batman collapses from the effects of the Joker's blood poison and sees a vision of his parents in front of a light, imploring their son to come into it and reunite with them. However, Batman shrugs it off and continues on. If the player visits the site of the murder, Batman discovers a pair of chalk outlines resembling his parents' bodies, as well as a bouquet of flowers and a tape recording from Hugo Strange, taunting the Dark Knight. The player then has the option to "pay respect" to the site, causing Batman to kneel at the site for a time. The Waynes' murders is also briefly mentioned in one of the Penguin's interview tapes during which Penguin tells Strange of being overjoyed after hearing the Waynes had been murdered, revealing hatred of the Wayne family due mainly to the Cobblepot family's long standing feud with them.
 The character is alluded in Batman: Arkham Origins. Following his capture of the Joker at the Royal Hotel and return to the Batcave, Batman has a vision of his parents' murder in Crime Alley. The site of the Waynes' murder can be found in Park Row's Crime Alley behind the Monarch Theatre (in the same location as it appeared in Arkham City). The pair of chalk outlines of Thomas and Martha are present along with a single rose. Thomas' New 52 Earth-2 Batman costume is an alternate outfit which can be used in challenge mode, online multiplayer, and story mode once the main story is completed.
 The Flashpoint Batman suit and Thomas Wayne's New 52 Earth-2 Batman suit appears in Batman: Arkham Knight, as downloadable content (DLC).

References

Characters created by Bill Finger
Characters created by Bob Kane
Characters created by Gardner Fox
Characters created by Jerry Robinson
Comics characters introduced in 1939
DC Comics male characters
DC Comics film characters
Fictional business executives
Fictional physicians
Fictional socialites
Fictional surgeons
Fictional philanthropists
Fictional murdered people
Batman characters